Federico Leandro Crescenti (born 13 July 2004) is an Austrian-Swiss professional footballer who plays as a forward for 2. Liga club Liefering.

Career statistics

Club

Notes

References

2004 births
Living people
Austrian footballers
Swiss men's footballers
Switzerland youth international footballers
Association football forwards
2. Liga (Austria) players
FC St. Gallen players
FC Red Bull Salzburg players
FC Liefering players
People from Dornbirn
Footballers from Vorarlberg